Hjalmar Ohlsson (October 9, 1891 – February 27, 1975) was a Swedish track and field athlete who competed in the 1912 Summer Olympics. In 1912 he finished seventh in the triple jump competition.

References

External links
profile 

1891 births
1975 deaths
Swedish male triple jumpers
Olympic athletes of Sweden
Athletes (track and field) at the 1912 Summer Olympics